Antonio Bayter Abud (8 October 1933 – 21 August 2020) was a Colombian Roman Catholic bishop.

Bayter Abud was born in Colombia and was ordained to the priesthood in 1956. He served as titular bishop of Sucarda and as bishop of the Apostolic Vicariate of Inírida, Colombia from 1997 until 2013.

Notes

1933 births
2020 deaths
20th-century Roman Catholic bishops in Colombia
21st-century Roman Catholic bishops in Colombia
Roman Catholic bishops of Inírida